George de Meo was an Italian-American arms dealer, most famous for supplying weapons to the Irish Republican Army (IRA) through their operative George Harrison.

De Meo lived near Harrison in Brooklyn, having moved there with family in 1949, and owned a gun store in the city. Having mafia connections, De Meo supplied guns not only to the IRA, but also to Cuban rebels. George De Meo was convicted of federal charges of conspiring to send arms to the IRA, in Raleigh, North Carolina in 1980.

References

Sources
The rebel with a cause….  Western People (Ireland). 23 February 2005. 
Robert D. McFadden. (6 November 1982). 5 are acquitted in Brooklyn of plot to run guns to I.R.A. The New York Times

Arms traders
People from Brooklyn
Criminals from New York City
American gangsters of Italian descent
Year of birth unknown
Year of death unknown